Farhad Darya is an Afghan singer, composer and music producer who has written and composed songs in various languages. 

Darya sings in various languages including mostly his native language of Persian/Dari and Pashto but also in Uzbeki, Hindi-Urdu and English.

Darya serves as the United Nations Development Program (UNDP) National Goodwill Ambassador for Afghanistan and is involved in numerous charitable organizations, such as Music Village and others.

Early years and personal life
Farhad Darya was born in Kabul, Afghanistan, to a Nasher branch of the Khilji Pashtun tribe. His family originated from Kunduz Province. He is the grandson of Sher Khan Nashir. 

He studied Persian literature while attending Kabul University. During this time, he wrote music for other artists under the pseudonym Abr (Cloud), and started playing Afghan and Indian classical music. He later left the university and enrolled in the Afghan Armed Forces. 

In 1990 he emigrated to Germany and began singing again. After travelling through Prague and Hamburg, Darya arrived in Paris, where he met Sultana Emam. The two were married and moved to Northern Virginia in the United States in 1995.

Career 

Since Darya's television debut on Afghanistan's television network in 1980, he has released over two dozen albums. He founded a band, Goroh-e-Baran (meaning "Rain Band") with Asad Badie, which became one of the best known Afghan bands in the 1980s. Throughout his career Darya has sold over 2 million copies of albums – the acclaimed ones produced in exile, many of which deal with the Soviet–Afghan War and the resulting misfortunes of the war-torn nation. Most of the music is aimed at helping Afghans bringing peace and unity to their country, and deals with themes of national unity.

He released his Salaam Afghanistan album in 2003, with a DVD release of music videos in March 2004.

In September 2006, Darya's new single Salamalek in a collaboration with German musician Peter Maffay was released, as part of Maffay's album Begegnungen – Eine Allianz für Kinder. It was Darya's first rock song.

In August 2007, Darya completed his new album HA! and was released in Afghanistan, followed by Germany in March 2008. The video of his song Dohle Bezan (Nazdeek Shodan) (Talk To Me/Closer) from the album HA! premiered on Afghan's national television in February 2008. Later that year, Darya's new album Yahoo was released.

He has not worked on a new album since, although has released several singles, including Attan, Dew Hai Mast, Nashkenad and Oo Ghaita.

Awards 
2003: Afghanistan: Best Singer of the Year
2005: Denmark: Best Singer of the Year
2006: Human Rights Award, by Commission of Human Rights
2008: Afghanistan: Best Album of the Year
2009: Afghanistan: Best Singer of the Year
2011: Dubai, UAE: Best Singer of the Year
2012: India: "Super Star" ATN Award

Discography 

Studio albums (Afghanistan-only releases)
Rahe Rafta (راه رفته) (1981)
Afghan Folk Music (محلي) (1982)
Zaro Jane (زارو جانه) (1982)
Baran (باران) (1983)
Ghazal (غزل) (1985)
Bolbole Awara (بلبل آواره) (1986)
Mazdeegar (مازديگر) (1988)
Bazme Ghazal (بزم غزل) (1988)
Mehrbaani (مهربانی) (1989)
Studio albums (International releases)
Begum Jan (بیگم جان) (1992)
Teri Soorat (तेरी सूरत / تیری صورت)
Afghanistan (افغانستان) (1995)
Shakar (شكر) (1997)
In Foreign Land  (در سرزمين بيگانه) (1999)
Qabila-e-Ashiq (قبیلهء عاشق) (2000)
Golom Golom   (گُلم گُلم) (2000)
Salaam Afghanistan (سلام افغانستان) (2003)
HA! (!ها ) (2007)
Yahoo (2008)
Video-only releases
Yaare Bewafaa (یار بی وفا) (1980)
Ateschparcha  (آتش پرچه) (1993)
Live In San Francisco (كنسرت سانفرانسيسكو) (1996)
Live In Europe (1999)
Compilations
Listen To The Banned (2010)
The Rough Guide To The Music Of Afghanistan (2010)

Filmography 
Darya produced additional scoring and lyrics for Through Her Eyes a film by Mithaq Kazimi in 2007.

Darya produced background music for the film In Foreign Land (1998).

References

External links 

Official Website

1962 births
Living people
Pashtun people
Afghan composers
People from Kabul
Afghan male singers
Hindi-language singers
Pashto-language singers
Persian-language singers
21st-century Afghan male singers
20th-century Afghan male singers
Afghan emigrants to the United States
Afghan expatriates in the United States